In geometry, a Cartesian oval is a plane curve consisting of points that have the same linear combination of distances from two fixed points (foci). These curves are named after French mathematician René Descartes, who used them in optics.

Definition
Let  and  be fixed points in the plane, and let  and  denote the Euclidean distances from these points to a third variable point . Let  and  be arbitrary real numbers. Then the Cartesian oval is the locus of points S satisfying .

Special cases
In the equation , when  and  the resulting shape is an ellipse. In the limiting case in which P and Q coincide, the ellipse becomes a circle. When  it is a limaçon of Pascal. If  and  the equation gives a branch of a hyperbola and thus is not a closed oval.

Polynomial equation
The set of points  satisfying the quartic polynomial equation

 

 

 

that have real solutions. The two ovals are generally disjoint, except in the case that  or  belongs to them. At least one of the two perpendiculars to  through points  and  cuts this quartic curve in four real points; it follows from this that they are necessarily nested, with at least one of the two points  and  contained in the interiors of both of them.  For a different parametrization and resulting quartic, see Lawrence.

Applications in optics
As Descartes discovered, Cartesian ovals may be used in lens design.
surface of revolution of one of these ovals, it is possible to design a so-called aplanatic lens, that has no spherical aberration.

Additionally, if a spherical wavefront is refracted through a spherical lens, or reflected from a concave spherical surface, the refracted or reflected wavefront takes on the shape of a Cartesian oval. The caustic formed by spherical aberration in this case may therefore be described as the evolute of a Cartesian oval.

History
The ovals of Descartes were first studied by René Descartes in 1637, in connection with their applications in optics.

These curves were also studied by Newton beginning in 1664. One method of drawing certain specific Cartesian ovals, already used by Descartes, is analogous to a standard construction of an ellipse by a pinned thread. If one stretches a thread from a pin at one focus to wrap around a pin at a second focus, and ties the free end of the thread to a pen, the path taken by the pen, when the thread is stretched tight, forms a Cartesian oval with a 2:1 ratio between the distances from the two foci. However, Newton rejected such constructions as insufficiently rigorous. He defined the oval as the solution to a differential equation, constructed its subnormals, and again investigated its optical properties.

James Clerk Maxwell rediscovered these curves, generalized them to curves defined by keeping constant the weighted sum of distances from three or more foci, and wrote a paper titled Observations on Circumscribed Figures Having a Plurality of Foci, and Radii of Various Proportions. An account of his results, titled On the description of oval curves, and those having a plurality of foci, was written by J.D. Forbes and presented to the Royal Society of Edinburgh in 1846, when Maxwell was at the young age of 14 (almost 15).

See also

Cassini oval
Two-center bipolar coordinates

References

External links

Benjamin Williamson, An Elementary Treatise on the Differential Calculus, Containing the Theory of Plane Curves (1884)
Algebraic curves